The Paraguay mabuya (Aspronema dorsivittatum) is a species of skink found in Uruguay, Paraguay, Argentina, Brazil, and Bolivia.

References

Aspronema
Reptiles described in 1862
Taxa named by Edward Drinker Cope